The 2020 Queensland state election was held on 31 October to elect all 93 members to the Legislative Assembly of Queensland. The Labor Party was returned to government for a third-term, led by incumbent premier Annastacia Palaszczuk. With 47 seats needed to form a majority government, Labor won 52 seats, including all but five in Brisbane, while the Liberal National Party won 34 seats and formed opposition. On the crossbench, Katter's Australian Party retained its 3 seats, the Queensland Greens picked up South Brisbane for a total of 2, Pauline Hanson's One Nation retained Mirani and independent Sandy Bolton retained her seat of Noosa.

At 11pm on 31 October, Liberal National Party leader Deb Frecklington conceded defeat, congratulating Palaszczuk on the election. Frecklington initially indicated that she would stay on as party leader, but on 2 November announced that she would convene a party meeting and resign as leader. David Crisafulli won the ensuing leadership spill and was elected LNP leader on 12 November 2020.

Palaszczuk became the first woman party leader to win three state elections in Australia, as well as the first Queensland Premier to increase their party's seat total across three successive elections.

Results

Vote summary

Seats changing parties
Six seats changed parties in this election. Five seats changed from Liberal National to Labor, while South Brisbane changed from Labor to the Greens.

Post-election pendulum

Background 

At the 2017 election, Labor won majority with 48 of 93 seats and formed government in the 56th Queensland Parliament. The LNP won 39 seats and formed opposition. Being allocated to crossbench, the Katter's Australian Party won three seats, One Nation won one seat, the Greens won one seat and Independent Sandy Bolton won the seat of Noosa.

Despite two by-elections, the composition of the 56th Parliament was unchanged, with the exception of the member for Whitsunday Jason Costigan. He was expelled from the LNP over allegations of behavioural impropriety, resulting in him joining the crossbench and eventually forming the North Queensland First party.

Labor has won all but one state election since 1989, and has only been out of government for five years since then. It lost its majority in 1996, giving way to a Coalition minority government that was defeated in 1998. In 2012, it suffered the worst defeat of a sitting government in the state's history, but regained power in 2015.

This election also marks the first time that both leaders of the current government and opposition have been female in a Queensland state election. It is only the second time it has occurred in an Australian state, territory or federal election, the first time being the 1995 ACT election.

A record number of minor parties and candidates ran in the election, 342 minor party candidates, 69 as independents or not officially endorsed by any party. Labor, the LNP and the Greens ran candidates in every electorate, Pauline Hanson's One Nation ran in 90 electorates.

Electoral system 
Queensland has compulsory voting and uses full-preference instant-runoff voting for single-member electorates. The election was conducted by the Electoral Commission of Queensland (ECQ).

Of the political parties contesting the election, the party, or coalition, that win the majority of seats (at least 47) forms the government.

The party, or coalition that gains the next highest number of seats forms the opposition, with the remaining parties and independents candidates being allocated to the cross bench.

Queensland Parliament is the only unicameral state parliament in Australia. It has just one House—the Legislative Assembly.

Key dates 
The election was for all 93 members of the Legislative Assembly. Pursuant to Constitution (Fixed Term Parliament) Amendment Act 2015 Queensland has fixed terms, with all elections following the 2020 vote scheduled every four years on the last Saturday of October. The Governor may call an election earlier than scheduled if the Government does not maintain confidence, or the annual appropriation bill fails to pass.

Under the legislation, the caretaker period commenced on 5 October 2020, 26 days prior to the election date.

Due to the COVID-19 pandemic, consideration was given to holding this election as a full postal ballot, but this did not occur. Despite this, a record number of postal votes was cast at the election, with a majority of Queenslanders voting before polling day.

The election timetable is as follows:

Registered parties
Since the previous election, 2017, six political parties were registered by Queensland's Electoral Commission: Shooters, Fishers and Farmers Party, North Queensland First, the Animal Justice Party, Clive Palmer's United Australia Party, Informed Medical Options Party, and Legalise Cannabis Queensland.

The following twelve registered parties contested the election, including a record number of minor parties:

 Australian Labor Party (Queensland Branch)
 Queensland Greens
 Pauline Hanson's One Nation
 Liberal National Party of Queensland
 Katter's Australian Party
 Civil Liberties & Motorists Party

 Shooters, Fishers and Farmers Party
 North Queensland First
 Animal Justice Party
 Clive Palmer's United Australia Party
 Informed Medical Options Party
 Legalise Cannabis Qld (Party)

Preferences
The LNP confirmed it would preference Labor candidates last on all of its how-to-vote cards. An exception is for Maiwar, a seat held by the Greens, where the LNP put the sitting Greens member below the Labor candidate in the how-to-vote card.

In response to LNP's preferences, Katter's Australia Party announced it would preference Greens candidates last on its party's how-to-vote cards, with party leader Robbie Katter suggesting the LNP's decision would lead to Greens candidates winning a number of seats in Brisbane. Katter's Australia Party and Pauline Hanson's One Nation also announced a preference deal on 8 October, with the parties to preference each other in second place on their how-to-vote cards.

Labor confirmed it would preference One Nation last on how-to-vote cards.

Retiring MPs

Labor
Kate Jones MP (Cooper) – announced 10 September 2020
Anthony Lynham MP (Stafford) – announced 10 September 2020
Coralee O'Rourke MP (Mundingburra) – announced 5 September 2020

Liberal National
Mark McArdle MP (Caloundra) – announced retirement 27 June 2019
Ted Sorensen MP (Hervey Bay) – announced retirement 25 May 2020
Simone Wilson MP (Pumicestone) – announced retirement 27 September 2019

Candidates

At the close of nominations on 11 October 2020, 597 candidates had nominated for the state election—the highest number of candidates at a Queensland state election, surpassing the previous record of 453 candidates at the 2017 election.

Leaders' debates
The first leaders' debate of the campaign between Palaszczuk and Frecklington was a People's Forum hosted by Sky News and the Courier Mail and was held on 28 October. The selected audience consisted of undecided voters who post-debate were asked which party they would vote for based on the debate performance of the respective leaders. A majority of 53% opted for Labor, 30% for the LNP, whilst the remaining 17% were undecided.

Polling
Several research, media and polling firms conduct opinion polls during the parliamentary term and prior to the state election in relation to voting. Most firms use an estimate of the flow of preferences at the previous election to determine the two-party-preferred vote; others ask respondents to nominate preferences.

Graphical summary

Opinion polling

Voting intention

Better premier and leadership approval polling

Notes

References

External links
2020 State General Election (Electoral Commission Queensland)
Queensland Votes (ABC News)
Queensland local government 2020 elections photographs, State Library of Queensland
Queensland 2020 state elections photographs, State Library of Queensland

Elections in Queensland
Queensland
2020s in Queensland
October 2020 events in Australia